Ralph Cooper (1908–1992) was an American actor, originator and master of ceremonies of Amateur Night at the Apollo Theater in Harlem.

Ralph Cooper may also refer to:
Ralph Cooper (Canadian football), see Canadian Football Hall of Fame
Ralph Cooper, drummer in Teddy and the Pandas

See also
Ralph Cooper Hutchison (1898–1966), president of Washington & Jefferson College and Lafayette College